The Women's 100 metres at the 2010 Commonwealth Games as part of the athletics programme was held at the Jawaharlal Nehru Stadium on Wednesday 6 October and Thursday 7 October 2010.

The final was subject to some controversy. England's Laura Turner and Australia's Sally Pearson had a simultaneous false start, but only Turner was initially disqualified, "on the grounds that her reaction time was the quicker". Turner refused to leave the track, and officials eventually authorised her to run "under protest", meaning that her time would not be recorded unless her disqualification was overturned. She finished last, and her time was not recorded. Pearson won the race, but admitted afterwards that she had "twitched first" out of the starting blocks, and England and Nigeria both requested that she be disqualified for her false start; her disqualification would enable Nigeria's Oludamola Osayomi to claim gold, and England's Katherine Endacott to claim bronze. Pearson was disqualified, and expressed tearful disappointment at having been "told [she] was clear": "I did my victory lap with the flag. I was walking out to the medal ceremony and then I was called back. That's not right". Australia counter-appealed, unsuccessfully.

On 11 October it was reported that supposed gold medal winner Oludamola Osayomi was the first person to test positive for banned substances during the 2010 Games, returning a positive doping test for the stimulant methylhexaneamine.  Osayomi was provisionally suspended pending the results of testing on her B sample.  It was reported that the positive testing was the result of prescription medication for a toothache.  When the B sample also tested positive Oludamola Osayomi was stripped of her 100m gold medal and Natasha Mayers of St Vincent and the Grenadines was promoted to the gold medal, while English runner Katherine Endacott was promoted to the silver medal (having originally placed fourth) and Cameroon's Bertille Atangana, who originally placed fifth will receive bronze.

Records

Heats
First 4 in each heat (Q) and 4 best performers (q) advance to the Semifinals.

Heat 1

Heat 2

Heat 3

Heat 4

Heat 5

Semifinals

Semifinal 1

Semifinal 2

Semifinal 3

Final

External links
2010 Commonwealth Games – Athletics

References

Women's 100 metres
2010
2010 in women's athletics